Scorzonera libanotica, also known as the Lebanese salsify and Lebanese viper's grass is a perennial member of the genus Scorzonera in the family Asteraceae.

Description 
The flower heads are supported by a scaly receptacles atop long pedicels. It has glabrous cylindrical involucral bracts  that are truncated at the base and slightly constricted at the top. The yellow flowers turn purple-red at the base and are larger than the involucre. It blooms in June and July. The fruit is a white, thick, long and deeply furrowed achene surmounted by a small pappus. S. libanotica leaves are whole, slightly toothed towards the base, oblong or oblong-lanceolate, more or less acute that narrow at the petiole.

Distribution and habitat 
Scorzonera libanotica is endemic to the mountainous regions of Lebanon and Syria; it grows in elevated meadows and pastures, rocky and grassy grounds, and old wall cracks

Uses 
The plant is used in folk medicine, its aerial parts are made into a decoction used orally to treat headaches. The plant's raw young shoots and leaves are edible.

References 

Cichorieae
Flora of Lebanon
Taxa named by Pierre Edmond Boissier